Vindingevals is a 1968 Swedish drama film directed by Åke Falck.

Cast
 Georg Rydeberg as Mr. Håkansson
 Keve Hjelm as The Man
 Diana Kjær as Elvira Kron
 Erik Hell as Oskar Kron
 Hans Ernback as Gustav Kron
 Gio Petré as Hanna Urström
 Kent Andersson as Alexander

References

External links
 

1968 films
1968 drama films
Swedish drama films
1960s Swedish-language films
1960s Swedish films